Adama Niane (23 August 1966 – 28 January 2023) was a French actor.

Biography
At the end of the 1980s, he acted onstage in pieces by Alfred de Musset, Pierre de Marivaux, Bernard-Marie Koltès, and Jean-Luc Lagarce.

He gained notoriety from his role as Sébastien Sangha in the series Plus belle la vie. He also appeared in minor roles in cinema, portraying serial killer Guy Georges in SK1.

On 28 January 2023, Niane died at the age of 56.

Filmography

Cinema
Mo (1996)
Baise-moi (2000)
35 Shots of Rum (2008)
SK1 (2014)
Le Gang des Antillais (2016)
Perdrix (2019)
Get In (2019)
 (2020)

Telefilms
 (2000)
 (2004)
 (2017)

Television
Commissaire Moulin (1992)
Julie Lescaut (2001)
 (2003)
Mystère (2007)
PJ (2009)
Plus belle la vie (2009)
 (2009–2010)
 (2011)
The Last Panthers (2015)
 (2016–2023)
Braquo (2016)
La Mante (2017)
 (2018)
 (2019)
Inhuman Resources (2020)
Lupin (2021)
 (2021)
 (2021)

References

External links

1966 births
2023 deaths
20th-century French male actors
21st-century French male actors
Sorbonne Nouvelle University Paris 3 alumni
Male actors from Paris